Taheera Augousti (birth 23 September 2005 ) is a South African field hockey player for the South African national team.

Career

Under–21
Augousti made her debut for the 2023 Junior Africa Cup in Ismailia.

National team
Augousti made her debut for the FIH Nations Cup in Valencia.

Personal life
She attended Eunice High School.

Honours
2023 Junior Africa Cup - Player of the Tournament.

References

External links

2005 births
Living people
South African female field hockey players
Female field hockey defenders